Take the "A" Train is a live album by American saxophonist Dexter Gordon recorded at the Jazzhus Montmartre in Copenhagen, Denmark in 1967 and first released on the Black Lion label in 1989.

Critical reception 

AllMusic critic Scott Yanow stated, "Throughout, Dexter Gordon is in consistently creative form, making this CD well worth getting by his fans." On All About Jazz James Nichols said, "We hear his immensely personal dry tone, humorous popular song quotes, very creative bebop solos and his listless and steadily paced baritone voice performing master of ceremonies duties. Very enjoyable, pick it up if you run across it."

Track listing 
 Introduction by Dexter Gordon – 0:59
 "But Not for Me" (George Gershwin, Ira Gershwin) – 15:13
 "Take the "A" Train" (Billy Strayhorn) – 10:34
 "For All We Know" [2nd Version] (J. Fred Coots, Sam M. Lewis) – 8:35 Bonus track on CD release
 "Blues Walk" [2nd Version] (Clifford Brown) – 11:01 Bonus track on CD release
 "I Guess I'll Have to Hang My Tears out to Dry" (Jule Styne, Sammy Cahn) – 6:08
 "Love for Sale" (Cole Porter) – 15:03

Personnel 
Dexter Gordon – tenor saxophone
Kenny Drew – piano
Niels-Henning Ørsted Pedersen – bass
Albert Heath – drums

References 

Black Lion Records live albums
Dexter Gordon live albums
1988 live albums
Albums recorded at Jazzhus Montmartre